Paramugil is a genus of mugilid mullets found in coastal waters, estuaries and rivers in the western Pacific region, ranging from the South China Sea to Australia.

Species
There are currently two recognized species in this genus:
 Paramugil georgii (J. D. Ogilby, 1897) (Silver mullet)
 Paramugil parmatus (Cantor, 1849) (Broad-mouthed mullet)

References

Mugilidae